Orlando Grootfaam (20 October 1974 - 7 August 2019) was a Surinamese professional footballer who played as midfielder for SV Robinhood. He died on 7 August 2019, in a hospital in Paramaribo, aged 44.

He has also been capped by Suriname.

References

External links
 

1974 births
Association football midfielders
Surinamese footballers
Suriname international footballers
S.V. Robinhood players
Sportvereniging Nationaal Leger players
SVB Eerste Divisie players
2019 deaths